Vladimir Šimunić (19 May 1919 – 24 December 1993) was a Croatian footballer and manager.

Career
Šimunić played with HŠK Građanski Zagreb in the Yugoslav First League as a goalkeeper from 1936 until 1943. He also made an appearance under the flag of the Independent State of Croatia, a World War II-era puppet state of Nazi Germany, on 14 June 1942 against Hungary.

Following his retirement from professional football he was appointed the head coach for NK Maribor in 1961, where he captured the Yugoslav Second League title in the 1966–67 season. In 1969, he went abroad to manage Grazer AK, and returned to Yugoslavia in 1973 to coach FK Borac Banja Luka. In 1972, he went to Canada to manage the National Soccer League side Toronto Croatia. In June 1974, he returned to manage Toronto Croatia and won the NSL Championship.

References

External links
 

1919 births
1993 deaths
Sportspeople from Pula
Association football goalkeepers
Yugoslav footballers
Croatian footballers
Croatia international footballers
HŠK Građanski Zagreb players
Yugoslav First League players
Yugoslav football managers
NK Maribor managers
Grazer AK managers
FK Borac Banja Luka managers
Toronto Croatia managers
Canadian National Soccer League coaches
Yugoslav expatriate football managers
Expatriate football managers in Austria
Yugoslav expatriate sportspeople in Austria
Expatriate soccer managers in Canada
Yugoslav expatriate sportspeople in Canada
Burials at Miroševac Cemetery